The Symphony No. 7 in A major, Op. 92, is a symphony in four movements composed by Ludwig van Beethoven between 1811 and 1812, while improving his health in the Bohemian spa town of Teplitz. The work is dedicated to Count Moritz von Fries.

At its premiere at the University in Vienna on 8 December 1813, Beethoven remarked that it was one of his best works. The second movement, "Allegretto", was so popular that audiences demanded an encore. The  "Allegretto" is frequently performed separately to this day.

History 
When Beethoven began composing the 7th symphony, Napoleon was planning his campaign against Russia. After the 3rd Symphony, and possibly the 5th as well, the 7th Symphony seems to be another of Beethoven's musical confrontations with Napoleon, this time in the context of the European wars of liberation from years of Napoleonic domination.

Beethoven's life at this time was marked by a worsening hearing loss, which made "conversation notebooks" necessary from 1819 on, with the help of which Beethoven communicated in writing.

Premiere 
The work was premiered with Beethoven himself conducting in Vienna on 8 December 1813 at a charity concert for soldiers wounded in the Battle of Hanau. In Beethoven's address to the participants, the motives are not openly named: "We are moved by nothing but pure patriotism and the joyful sacrifice of our powers for those who have sacrificed so much for us."

The program also included the patriotic work Wellington's Victory, exalting the victory of the British over Napoleon's France. The orchestra was led by Beethoven's friend Ignaz Schuppanzigh and included some of the finest musicians of the day: violinist Louis Spohr, composers Johann Nepomuk Hummel, Giacomo Meyerbeer and Antonio Salieri. The Italian guitar virtuoso Mauro Giuliani played cello at the premiere.

The piece was very well received, such that the audience demanded the Allegretto movement be encored immediately. Spohr made particular mention of Beethoven's enthusiastic gestures on the podium ("as a sforzando occurred, he tore his arms with a great vehemence asunder ... at the entrance of a forte he jumped in the air"), and "the friends of Beethoven made arrangements for a repetition of the concert" by which "Beethoven was extricated from his pecuniary difficulties".

Editions 
The first edition of the score, parts and piano reduction was published in November 1816 by Steiner & Comp.

A facsimile of Beethoven's manuscript was published in 2017 by Laaber Verlag.

Instrumentation
The symphony is scored for 2 flutes, 2 oboes, 2 clarinets in A, 2 bassoons, 2 horns in A (E and D in the inner movements), 2 trumpets in D, timpani, and strings.

Form
There are four movements:

A typical performance lasts approximately 40 minutes.

The work as a whole is known for its use of rhythmic devices suggestive of a dance, such as dotted rhythm and repeated rhythmic figures. It is also tonally subtle, making use of the tensions between the key centres of A, C and F. For instance, the first movement is in A major but has repeated episodes in C major and F major. In addition, the second movement is in A minor with episodes in A major, and the third movement, a scherzo, is in F major.

I. Poco sostenuto – Vivace 
The first movement starts with a long, expanded introduction marked Poco sostenuto (metronome mark:  = 69) that is noted for its long ascending scales and a cascading series of applied dominants that facilitates modulations to C major and F major. From the last episode in F major, the movement transitions to Vivace through a series of no fewer than sixty-one repetitions of the note E.

The Vivace ( = 104) is in sonata form, and is dominated by lively dance-like dotted rhythms, sudden dynamic changes, and abrupt modulations. The first theme of the Vivace is shown below.

The development section opens in C major and contains extensive episodes in F major. The movement finishes with a long coda, which starts similarly as the development section. The coda contains a famous twenty-bar passage consisting of a two-bar motif repeated ten times to the background of a grinding four octave deep pedal point of an E.

II. Allegretto 
The second movement in A minor has a tempo marking of allegretto ("a little lively"), making it slow only in comparison to the other three movements. This movement was encored at the premiere and has remained popular since. Its reliance on the string section makes it a good example of Beethoven's advances in orchestral writing for strings, building on the experimental innovations of Haydn.

The movement is structured in ternary form. It begins with the main melody played by the violas and cellos, an ostinato (repeated rhythmic figure, or ground bass, or passacaglia of a quarter note, two eighth notes and two quarter notes).

This melody is then played by the second violins while the violas and cellos play a second melody, described by George Grove as, "like a string of beauties hand-in-hand, each afraid to lose her hold on her neighbours". The first violins then take the first melody while the second violins take the second. This progression culminates with the wind section playing the first melody while the first violin plays the second.

After this, the music changes from A minor to A major as the clarinets take a calmer melody to the background of light triplets played by the violins. This section ends thirty-seven bars later with a quick descent of the strings on an A minor scale, and the first melody is resumed and elaborated upon in a strict fugato.

III. Presto – Assai meno presto

The third movement is a scherzo in F major and trio in D major. Here, the trio (based on an Austrian pilgrims' hymn) is played twice rather than once. This expansion of the usual A–B–A structure of ternary form into A–B–A–B–A was quite common in other works of Beethoven of this period, such as his Fourth Symphony, Pastoral Symphony, 8th Symphony,  and String Quartet Op. 59 No. 2.

IV. Allegro con brio 

The last movement is in sonata form. According to music historian Glenn Stanley, Beethoven "exploited the possibility that a string section can realize both angularity and rhythmic contrast if used as an obbligato-like background", particularly in the coda, which contains an example, rare in Beethoven's music, of the dynamic marking .

In his book Beethoven and his Nine Symphonies, Sir George Grove wrote, "The force that reigns throughout this movement is literally prodigious, and reminds one of Carlyle's hero Ram Dass, who has 'fire enough in his belly to burn up the entire world.'" Donald Tovey, writing in his Essays in Musical Analysis, commented on this movement's "Bacchic fury" and many other writers have commented on its whirling dance-energy. The main theme is a precise duple time variant of the instrumental ritornello in Beethoven's own arrangement of the Irish folk-song "Save me from the grave and wise", No. 8 of his Twelve Irish Folk Songs, WoO 154.

Reception
Critics and listeners have often felt stirred or inspired by the Seventh Symphony. For instance, one program-note author writes:
... the final movement zips along at an irrepressible pace that threatens to sweep the entire orchestra off its feet and around the theater, caught up in the sheer joy of performing one of the most perfect symphonies ever written.

Composer and music author Antony Hopkins says of the symphony:
The Seventh Symphony perhaps more than any of the others gives us a feeling of true spontaneity; the notes seem to fly off the page as we are borne along on a floodtide of inspired invention. Beethoven himself spoke of it fondly as "one of my best works". Who are we to dispute his judgment?

Another admirer, composer Richard Wagner, referring to the lively rhythms which permeate the work, called it the "apotheosis of the dance".

On the other hand, admiration for the work has not been universal. Friedrich Wieck, who was present during rehearsals, said that the consensus, among musicians and laymen alike, was that Beethoven must have composed the symphony in a drunken state; and the conductor Thomas Beecham commented on the third movement: "What can you do with it? It's like a lot of yaks jumping about."

The oft-repeated claim that Carl Maria von Weber considered the chromatic bass line in the coda of the first movement evidence that Beethoven was "ripe for the madhouse" seems to have been the invention of Beethoven's first biographer, Anton Schindler. His possessive adulation of Beethoven is well-known, and he was criticised by his contemporaries for his obsessive attacks on Weber. According to John Warrack, Weber's biographer, Schindler was characteristically evasive when defending Beethoven, and there is "no shred of concrete evidence" that Weber ever made the remark.

In popular culture 
 The 1934 horror film The Black Cat features the second movement prominently.
 The 1974 science fiction film Zardoz (1974), directed by John Boorman. An excerpt from the Second Movement is played over the closing montage and the end credits.
 The first episode of Cosmos: A Personal Voyage (1980) features the first movement to "underscore the vastness and diversity of Earth with its 'resplendent spaciousness'".
 The 1995 drama film Mr. Holland's Opus uses the second movement to underscore the high school music teacher Mr. Holland recounting the tragedy of Beethoven's hearing loss, with Holland's son being deaf and unable to share his father's passion for music.
 The 2006 film The Fall uses the second movement at several points in the film.
 The 2006 live-action adaption of Nodame Cantabile uses the first movement as the opening theme. The 2007 anime adaptation uses it as the ending theme.
 The 2007 comedy-drama film The Darjeeling Limited uses the fourth movement.
 The 2009 science fiction film Knowing uses the second movement during the climactic scene, a mass exodus from apocalyptic Boston.
 In the 2010 historical drama film The King's Speech, the second movement is used during King George's climactic speech at Buckingham Palace after the commencement of the country's involvement in World War II. The slow build up of the movement "accents his struggle and his perseverance".
 In the 2016 superhero film X-Men: Apocalypse the second movement is played during the launch of all the world's nuclear weapons.

References

Sources

External links

 
 
 Full Score of Beethoven's Seventh Symphony
 "Notes on Beethoven's Seventh Symphony" by Christopher H. Gibbs, program note for a Philadelphia Orchestra performance, via NPR, 13 June 2006
 "Aperçu of Apotheosis", Program notes by Ron Drummond, Northwest Sinfonietta, October 2003
 Program notes by Christine Lee Gengaro for the Los Angeles Chamber Orchestra, November 2010
 

07
1812 compositions
Compositions in A major
Music dedicated to benefactors or patrons